Elsebeth Brehm Jorgensen (30 July 1901 – 14 July 1995) was a Danish tennis player. She represented Denmark at the 1920 Summer Olympics and at the 1924 Summer Olympics.

In 1921, she along with Ebba Meyer emerged as the champions in the World Covered Court Championships.

References 

Danish female tennis players
Olympic tennis players of Denmark
Tennis players at the 1920 Summer Olympics
Tennis players at the 1924 Summer Olympics
Sportspeople from Frederiksberg
1901 births
1995 deaths
20th-century Danish women